Lot 23 is a township in Queens County, Prince Edward Island, Canada.  It is part of Greenville Parish. Lot 23 was awarded to Allan and Lauchlin MacLeane in the 1767 land lottery.

Communities

Incorporated municipalities:

 Darlington
 Hunter River
 Stanley Bridge, Hope River, Bayview, Cavendish and North Rustico

Civic address communities:

 Brookfield
 Cavendish
 Darlington
 Greenvale
 Hunter River
 Mayfield
 New Glasgow
 Rennies Road
 St. Ann
 Toronto
 Wheatley River

References

23
Geography of Queens County, Prince Edward Island